The 2008 CAF Champions League Final was a football tie held over two legs in December 2008 between Al-Ahly, and Coton Sport FC de Garoua.

Qualified teams
In the following table, finals until 1996 were in the African Cup of Champions Club era, since 1997 were in the CAF Champions League era.

Venues

Cairo International Stadium

Cairo International Stadium, formerly known as Nasser Stadium, is an Olympic-standard, multi-use stadium with an all-seated capacity of 75,000. The architect of the stadium is the German Werner March, who had built from 1934 to 1936 the Olympic Stadium in Berlin. Before becoming an all seater stadium, it had the ability to hold over 100,000 spectators, reaching a record of 120,000. It is the foremost Olympic-standard facility befitting the role of Cairo, Egypt as the center of events in the region. It is also the 69th largest stadium in the world. Located in Nasr City; a suburb north east of Cairo, it was completed in 1960, and was inaugurated by President Gamal Abd El Nasser on 23 July that year, the eighth anniversary of the Egyptian Revolution of 1952. Zamalek SC currently use the Petro Sport Stadium for most of their home games and Al Ahly use Al Salam Stadium for most of their home games.

Roumdé Adjia Stadium

Stade Roumdé Adjia is a multi-purpose stadium in Garoua, Cameroon.  It is currently used mostly for football matches. It serves as a home ground of Cotonsport Garoua. The stadium holds 30,000 people and was built in 1978. The capacity is 22,000 people. This stadium is set to be one of the stadiums used in the African Cup of Nations in 2021. It'will be renovated by Mota-Engil.

Road to final

1Al Tahrir of Eritrea withdrew because of an internal club problem.

Format
The final was decided over two legs, with aggregate goals used to determine the winner. If the sides were level on aggregate after the second leg, the away goals rule would have been applied, and if still level, the tie would have proceeded directly to a penalty shootout (no extra time is played).

Matches

First leg

Second leg

Coton Sport's captain, Ahmadou Ngomna was suspended for the second leg.

Notes and references

External links
2008 CAF Champions League - cafonline.com

2008
1
Al Ahly SC matches
Coton Sport FC de Garoua